Mount Ward is a mountain at the northeast end of Steeple Peaks, located south of Batterbee Mountains near George VI Sound in western Palmer Land. During a flight on December 23, 1947, by the Ronne Antarctic Research Expedition (RARE) (1947–48) a high peak was seen in the area southeast of Batterbee Mountains. It was named by F. Ronne after W.W. Ward of Beaumont, Texas, editor of the Beaumont Journal and a supporter of the expedition. No peak exists at the coordinates given by Ronne, but it is most likely that the feature here described was that seen by him.

Mountains of Palmer Land